Fagun Haway is a Bangladeshi historical drama film based on the novel Bou Kotha Kou by Tito Rahman. This movie based on the Bengali language movement during 1952 in East Pakistan. This was the sixth film directed by Tauquir Ahmed simultaneously released in February 2019 at 52 cinema halls across the country.

Bangladesh Federation of Film Societies (BFFS) nominated this film for the Best International Feature Film category at the 92nd Academy Awards. Faridur Reza Sagar's Fagun Haway and Star Cineplex’s film No Dorai have jointly won the Bangladesh National Film Award for Best Film of 2019.

Cast
 Siam Ahmed as Nasir
 Nusrat Imrose Tisha as Deepti
 Yashpal Sharma as Jamshed 
 Abul Hayat as Deepti's grandfather 
 Afroza Banu as Nasir's mother 
 Rawnak Hasan as Obayed
 Saju Khadem as Manju
 Fazlur Rahman Babu as Chandor
 Shahidul Alam Sachchu as Amzad
 Faruque Ahmed as Moulvi
 A K Azad Shetu
 Naresh Bhuiyan 
 Abdur Rahim
 Hasan Ahmed
 Siam Hasan Redoy as Noyon Babu

Soundtrack

Awards 
Bangladesh National Film Award for Best Film of 2019.

References

External links
 
 

Bengali-language Bangladeshi films
2019 films
2010s historical drama films
Films set in East Pakistan
Films directed by Tauquir Ahmed
2010s Bengali-language films
Bangladeshi historical drama films
Films based on Bengali language movement
2019 drama films
Films shot in Khulna
Best Film National Film Award (Bangladesh) winners